Vujičić is a Serbian surname, a patronymic derived from Vujič or Vujica, hypocoristics of the given name Vuk (meaning "wolf"). It is borne by ethnic Serbs. It is one of numerous surnames derived from the root Vuk. It is present throughout former Yugoslavia. It may refer to:

 Nick Vujicic (born 1982), Australian motivational speaker, Serbian parentage
 Tanja Vujičić (born 1990), Bosnian beauty queen, ethnic Serb
 Godefroy Vujicic (born 1975), French cellist, Serbian parentage

See also 
 Vujčić
 Vujačić
 Wójcik
 Vujić

References

External links

Serbian surnames